Peter McLean may refer to:

Peter McLean (politician) (1837–1924), member of the Queensland Legislative Assembly
Peter McLean (cabinet maker) (fl. 1860s), Australian furniture maker
Peter McLean (Australian rules footballer) (1941–2009), represented both Melbourne and Carlton in the VFL in the 1960s
Peter Douglas McLean (1853–1936), educator, physician and political figure in Ontario, Canada
Peter McLean of the McLean Family (rugby footballers), played rugby union tests for Australia
Peter McLean (rugby league), Australian rugby league footballer
Peter McLean (singer), Australian folk singer